Tontogany (YTB-821) was a United States Navy  named for Tontogany, Ohio.

Construction

The contract for Tontogany was awarded 9 August 1971. She was laid down on 4 December 1972 at Marinette, Wisconsin, by Marinette Marine and launched 16 May 1973.

Operational history

Delivered to the Navy on 28 July 1973, Tontogany was attached to the 5th Naval District and operated at Norfolk, Va., where she provided tug and towing services, waterfront fire protection, and pilot assistance. Late in 1977, she was shifted to the 6th Naval District, Charleston, SC, where she served into October 1979.

Stricken from the Navy List 13 March 2001, ex-Tontogany was sold by Defense Reutilization and Marketing Service (DRMS) 20 November 2001.  Acquired by McAllister Towing and Transportation, she was renamed Dorothy McAllister.

References

External links
 

 

Natick-class large harbor tugs
Ships built by Marinette Marine
1973 ships